Lalibela Airport  is an airport serving Lalibela, a town in the Amhara Region of Ethiopia. The name of the town and airport may also be transliterated as Lalibella.

Facilities

The main runway was rebuilt in 1997, at a cost of 53 million birr.

Airlines and destinations

Airport and incidents

Civil war of the 1970s-1980s
On 14 March 1975, Douglas C-47 ET-ABR of Ethiopian Airlines was destroyed on the ground during a clash with rebels.

References

External links

ASN - Lalibela Airport

Airports in Ethiopia
Amhara Region
Buildings and structures in Lalibela